Save Our Marine Life (SOML) is an Australian not-for-profit, non-governmental environmental advocacy alliance working to protect and secure Australia's marine life.  It is a collaboration of 29 non-profit conservation organisations, both Australian and international. SOML was initially founded in 2008 to raise awareness of the need for the Australian Government to establish a network of large marine sanctuaries in the country's South West marine region. In 2010 SOML became a national campaign in order to drive the completion of Australia's National Network of Marine Parks.

As a result of the SOML campaign and the long-standing Australian Government NRSMPA program (National Representative System of Marine Protected Areas) in 2012 the Gillard Labor Government declared 44 new federal marine parks in the South-west, North-west, North, Coral Sea and Temperate East marine regions, bringing Australia's federal marine park total to 60, covering a total area of 3.3million square kilometers (36% of Australia's Exclusive Economic Zone (EEZ)) - the largest marine parks network in the world.

In December 2013 the incoming Abbott Coalition Government suspended the operation of the 44 new parks before they could commence operation (which was scheduled for July 2014), and commenced an independent review. That review provided its findings to the then Federal Environment Minister Greg Hunt in December 2015. The findings were released to the public in September 2016. Whilst endorsing the process undertaken by previous governments to develop the 44 marine parks, the Review recommended changes to zoning in a number of the new parks.

In September 2016 the Turnbull Coalition Government commenced a further public consultation process to develop new management plans for the marine parks in order to change the zoning. In March 2018 the revised management plans were tabled in the Australian Parliament for consideration. Changes to the original 2012 zoning in the parks included removal of almost half the high level protective green ‘sanctuary’ zoning across the network - an area almost twice the size of the state of Victoria and equivalent in area to the loss of half of Australia's national parks on land - the biggest single windback of conservation area in Australia's history.

The alliance groups include:
 Australian Conservation Foundation
 Australian Marine Conservation Society
 Conservation Council of Western Australia
 Cairns and Far North Environment Centre
 Conservation Council of WA
 Conservation Council of South Australia
 Environment Centre of the Northern Territory
 Environment Tasmania
 Environment Victoria
 Environs Kimberley
 Greenpeace Asia Pacific
 Humane Society International
 International Fund for Animal Welfare
 National Parks Association of NSW
 National Parks Association of Qld
 Nature Conservation Council of NSW
 North Queensland Conservation Council
 Queensland Conservation Council
 Project AWARE Foundation
 Sealife Trust
 Sea Shepherd
 Surfrider
 The Nature Conservancy
 The Pew Charitable Trusts
 The Wilderness Society
 Victorian National Parks Association
 Whale and Dolphin Conservation Society
 Wildlife Preservation Council of Qld
 World Wildlife Fund – Australia

What's at stake

Marine sanctuaries (green zones) are proven to work alongside sensible fisheries management to provide safe havens for fish and marine life to recover and rebuild. Sanctuaries have been shown to prevent local extinctions and help make coral reefs more resilient to the impacts of climate change.
 
In 2012, Australia made history by creating the world's largest network of marine sanctuaries – protecting our incredible marine life, safeguarding our enviable coastal lifestyle, and giving fish populations across Australia the chance to rebuild and thrive.

The creation of the national network crossed political divides and received bi-partisan political support. It was initiated by John Howard's Coalition Government in 1998, and finalised by the federal Labor Government in 2012. In 2014 the Abbott Coalition Government suspended the parks from operation pending a review.

On 1 July 2018 the 44 federal/Commonwealth waters parks created in 2012 commenced operation with revised zoning amidst great concern at the loss of almost half the highly protective green zoning.

The SOML campaign to ensure Australia's unique and important marine environment has a science based network of marine parks and sanctuaries, continues.

Marine life is one of the most important things that is in the world, it beholds secrets to be found out in the deep blue sea.

HUMBACK WHALES

Humpback whales are a little bit like blue whales but not larger than the blue whale itself the humpback whale is actually one of the whales that barnacles stick to.

References

Further reading 
 Towie, Narelle (18 May 2009), Better protection for 1.4m sq km of WA marine parks, PerthNow, (Perth, Australia), retrieved 28 January 2010

External links 
Save Our Marine Life official site

Nature conservation organisations based in Australia
Nature conservation in Western Australia
2009 establishments in Australia